The Convention on Road Signs and Signals, commonly known as the Vienna Convention on Road Signs and Signals, is a multilateral treaty designed to increase road safety and aid international road traffic by standardising the signing system for road traffic (road signs, traffic lights and road markings) in use internationally.

This convention was agreed upon by the United Nations Economic and Social Council at its Conference on Road Traffic in Vienna 7 October to 8 November 1968, was concluded in Vienna on 8 November 1968, and entered into force on 6 June 1978. This conference also produced the Vienna Convention on Road Traffic, which complements this legislation by standardising international traffic laws.

The convention revised and substantially extended the earlier 1949 Geneva Protocol on Road Signs and Signals, itself based in turn on the 1931 Geneva Convention concerning the Unification of Road Signals. Amendments, including new provisions regarding the legibility of signs, priority at roundabouts, and new signs to improve safety in tunnels were adopted in 2003.

Both the Vienna Convention and the Geneva Protocol were formed according to consensus on road traffic signs that evolved primarily in 20th century continental Western Europe. In order to make it as universal as possible, the convention allows some variations, for example danger warning signs can be triangular or square diamond in shape and road markings can be white or yellow. Though most UN members have not ratified the full treaty, the signs and legal principles enshrined in it form the basis of traffic law in a majority of places.

An alternative convention called the SADC-RTSM, provided by the Southern African Development Community (SADC), is used by ten countries in southern Africa. Many of the rules and principles of the SADC-RTSM are similar to those of the Vienna Convention.

In the United States, signs are based on the US Federal Highway Administration's Manual on Uniform Traffic Control Devices. Signs in the MUTCD are often more text-oriented, though some signs do use pictograms as well. Canada and Australia have road signs based substantially on the MUTCD. In South America, Ireland, several Asian countries (Cambodia, Japan, Thailand, Malaysia and Indonesia) and New Zealand, road signage is influenced by both the Vienna Convention and MUTCD.

Rules

Road signs
In article 2 the convention classes all road signs into a number of categories (A – H):
 A: Danger warning signs
 B: Priority signs
 C: Prohibitory or restrictive signs
 D: Mandatory signs
 E: Special regulation signs
 F: Information, facilities, or service signs
 G: Direction, position, or indication sign
 H: Additional panels

The convention then lays out precise colours, sizes, and shapes for each of these classes of sign:

† May be written in English or the national language

It also specifies the symbols and pictograms which may be used, and the orientations in which they may be used. When more than one is available, the same one must be used nationally. All signs, except for those that do not apply at night, must be reflective enough to be seen in darkness with headlights from a distance.

Road markings
The convention also specifies road markings. The road markings shall be white or yellow.

The length and width of markings varies according to purpose, although no exact figures for size are stated; roads in built up areas should use a broken line for lane division, while continuous lines must only be used in special cases, such as reduced visibility or narrowed carriageways.

All words painted on the road surface should be either of place names, or of words recognisable in most languages, such as "Stop" or "Taxi".

Traffic lights
The Convention specifies the colours for traffic lights and their meanings, and places and purposes lights may be used for, like so:

Red flashing lights may only be used at the locations specified above; any other use of the lights is in breach of the convention. Red lights must be placed on top when lights are stacked vertically, or on the side closest to oncoming traffic if stacked horizontally.

Contracting parties
The convention has 71 state parties and 35 signatories (including acceding members) as of October 2022: Albania, Armenia, Austria, Bahrain, Belarus, Belgium, Benin, Bosnia and Herzegovina, Brazil, Bulgaria, Central African Republic, Chile, Costa Rica, Côte d'Ivoire, Croatia, Cuba, Cyprus, Czech Republic, Democratic Republic of the Congo, Denmark, Ecuador, Estonia, Finland, France, Georgia, Germany, Ghana, Greece, Guyana, Holy See, Hungary, India, Indonesia, Iran, Iraq, Italy, Kazakhstan, Kuwait, Kyrgyzstan, Latvia, Liberia, Liechtenstein, Lithuania, Luxembourg, North Macedonia, Mexico, Moldova, Mongolia, Montenegro, Morocco, Myanmar, Netherlands, Nigeria, Norway, Pakistan, Paraguay, the Philippines, Poland, Portugal, Romania, Russia, San Marino, Saudi Arabia, Senegal, Serbia, Seychelles, Sierra Leone, Slovakia, Slovenia, Spain, Sri Lanka, Suriname, Sweden, Switzerland, Tajikistan, Thailand, Tunisia, Turkmenistan, Uganda, Ukraine, United Arab Emirates, United Kingdom, Uzbekistan, Venezuela and Vietnam.

The only countries in Europe that are not parties to the convention are Ireland, Iceland and Malta. Andorra is a signatory but have yet to ratify the convention. 

The only countries in Asia that are not parties to the convention are Afghanistan, Bangladesh, Malaysia, People's Republic of China (including Hong Kong and Macau), Republic of China (Taiwan), Israel, Japan, Jordan, Lebanon, North Korea, Oman, Palestine, Syria and Yemen. Cambodia, Laos, and South Korea are all signatories, but have yet to ratify the convention.

Other countries have not signed the convention; however, some have voluntarily adopted some Vienna convention signs.

See also
Vienna Convention on Road Traffic
Comparison of European road signs
Comparison of MUTCD-influenced traffic signs
Comparison of traffic signs in English-speaking countries

References

External links

 Ratifications — UN Treaty Collection
 Road Traffic and Road Signs and Signals Agreements and Conventions — United Nations Economic Commission for Europe
 Full text of convention
 Consolidated text of convention including diagrams
 Amendments adopted in 2003

Rules of the road
Traffic signs
Traffic signals
Traffic law
Treaties concluded in 1968
Treaties entered into force in 1978
United Nations treaties
Treaties of Albania
Treaties of Armenia
Treaties of Austria
Treaties of Azerbaijan
Treaties of Bahrain
Treaties of the Byelorussian Soviet Socialist Republic
Treaties of Belgium
Treaties of Bosnia and Herzegovina
Treaties of the People's Republic of Bulgaria
Treaties of the Central African Republic
Treaties of Chile
Treaties of Ivory Coast
Treaties of Croatia
Treaties of Cuba
Treaties of Cyprus
Treaties of Czechoslovakia
Treaties of the Czech Republic
Treaties of Zaire
Treaties of Denmark
Treaties of Estonia
Treaties of Finland
Treaties of France
Treaties of Georgia (country)
Treaties of West Germany
Treaties of East Germany
Treaties of Greece
Treaties of Guyana
Treaties of the Hungarian People's Republic
Treaties of India
Treaties of Pahlavi Iran
Treaties of Ba'athist Iraq
Treaties of Italy
Treaties of Kazakhstan
Treaties of Kuwait
Treaties of Kyrgyzstan
Treaties of Latvia
Treaties of Liberia
Treaties of Lithuania
Treaties of Luxembourg
Treaties of Moldova
Treaties of Mongolia
Treaties of Montenegro
Treaties of Morocco
Treaties of the Netherlands
Treaties of Nigeria
Treaties of Norway
Treaties of Pakistan
Treaties of the Philippines
Treaties of the Polish People's Republic
Treaties of Portugal
Treaties of the Socialist Republic of Romania
Treaties of the Soviet Union
Treaties of San Marino
Treaties of Senegal
Treaties of Serbia and Montenegro
Treaties of Yugoslavia
Treaties of Seychelles
Treaties of Slovakia
Treaties of Slovenia
Treaties of Sweden
Treaties of Switzerland
Treaties of Tajikistan
Treaties of North Macedonia
Treaties of Tunisia
Treaties of Turkmenistan
Treaties of the Ukrainian Soviet Socialist Republic
Treaties of the United Kingdom
Treaties of the United Arab Emirates
Treaties of Uzbekistan
Treaties of Vietnam
1968 in Austria
Transport treaties
1968 in transport
Treaties extended to West Berlin
November 1968 events
1960s in Vienna
Transportation engineering standards